National symbols of Slovakia are the flag of Slovakia, the coat of arms of Slovakia, the Slovak state seal and the Slovak anthem. These are protected by law and have restrictions on their use and reproduction. The coat of arms (the two-barred cross) originated in the Byzantine (Eastern Roman) Empire in the 9th century.

References